"Dry Riser" is a song by Kerbdog and a single released in 1994, taken from their self titled debut album, recorded at Rockfield Studios, Wales by Jack Endino. The single was released on four different formats, two CDs, and two 7" vinyls. CD1 was released as a limited edition Digipak and one of the 7" singles was released as a limited edition, pressed on clear vinyl as opposed to the usual black. The single climbed to number sixty on the UK Singles Chart.

Many of the B-sides over the four discs are covers. "New Day Rising" is a cover of the song by Hüsker Dü from their album of the same name, "Suspect Device" is a cover of the song by Stiff Little Fingers, their debut single from 1978, and "Something In My Head" is a cover of the song by a band called The Jerusalem Taxis, a local band on the Irish scene that Kerbdog's singer Cormac Battle is a fan of.

The two B-sides on CD1, "Xenophobia" and "Self Inflicted", as well as "Same With The Hammer" from the 7" clear vinyl, are Kerbdog originals.

"Xenophobia" and "Self Inflicted" recorded by Jack Endino assisted by Phil Ault. "Same with the Hammer" and "Something in my Head" recorded by Nick Woolage. "New Day Rising" and "Suspect Device" recorded by Pat Dunne assisted by Lorcan Cousins.

Track listing of CD1 (Digipak)

 "Dry Riser"
 "Xenophobia"
 "Self Inflicted"

Track listing of CD2
VERCX83

 "Dry Riser"
 "New Day Rising"
 "Suspect Device"

Track listing of limited edition clear vinyl 7"

A) "Dry Riser"
B) "Same With The Hammer"

Track listing of black vinyl 7"

A) "Dry Riser"
B) "Something In My Head"

Promos

There was also a 12" single DJ promo (VERDJ83) which featured Dry Riser on both sides.

Chart performance
"Dry Riser" entered the UK singles charts on 12 March 1994 and spent one week at number 60.

References

1994 singles
Kerbdog songs
1994 songs
Vertigo Records singles
Songs written by Cormac Battle